USGP may refer to:

 United States Grand Prix, a race for the Formula One automobile racing series
 United States motorcycle Grand Prix, a race for the MotoGP motorcycle racing series
 Green Party (United States), a political party in the United States

See also
 U.S. 500
 Grand Prix of America
 United States Grand Prix (disambiguation)
 American Grand Prix (disambiguation)